The Lord Mayor of Dublin is the head of Dublin City Council and first citizen of Dublin. The title was created in 1229 as Mayor of Dublin. It was elevated to Lord Mayor in 1665. The date of the election is the end of June, and the term of office is one year.

Mayors of Dublin

13th century

14th century

15th century

16th century

17th century

Lords Mayor of Dublin
In 1665 Sir Daniel Bellingham became the first Lord Mayor of Dublin.

17th century

18th century

19th century

1801–1840

1841–1900
The Municipal Corporations (Ireland) Act 1840 comes into force. Under this Act, all ratepayers with a yearly valuation of £10 could vote in civic elections and sit on the council. Dublin Corporation (now Dublin City Council) becomes the new municipal authority for the city of Dublin. Daniel O'Connell was elected to the new Dublin Corporation and took office as Lord Mayor of Dublin, the first Roman Catholic to be Lord Mayor since 1690.

1.For a period there was an agreement to alternate the mayor's chair between Tory (Conservative) and Whigs (Liberals, Repealers).

20th century

2.Thomas Kelly was unanimously elected as Lord Mayor while being held as a political prisoner in Wormwood Scrubs prison in England.

21st century

See also

 Timeline of Dublin
 Sheriff of Dublin City
 Sheriff of County Dublin
 List of Clerks of the Tholsel

References

Sources
Medieval Dublin: The Living City, Howard Clarke, Pages 156–162

External links
Mayors and Lord Mayors of Dublin 1229–1924
Lord Mayor's of Dublin 1665–2017 (Dublin City Council)

 
Dublin
Lord Mayor of Dublin
Mayo